Football Club Dabas is a professional football club based in Dabas, Pest County, Hungary, that competes in the Nemzeti Bajnokság III, the third tier of Hungarian football.

Name changes
?–50: Alsódabasi EPOSz
1997–00: Dabas VSE
2000–02: Diego-FC Dabas
2000: purchased the right from Érdi VSE
2002–present: Football Club Dabas

External links
 Official website of FC Dabas
 Profile on Magyar Futball

References

Football clubs in Hungary
Association football clubs established in 1950
1950 establishments in Hungary